Saugatuck Dunes State Park is a public recreation area covering  on the shore of Lake Michigan between Saugatuck and Holland in Allegan County, Michigan.

History
The site was once part of the estate of inventor Dorr E. Felt, whose summer home, the Felt Mansion, is an in-holding within the state park that is undergoing restoration. Built by the inventor of the comptometer in 1928, the Felt's summer home was sold to the St. Augustine Seminary in 1949 and used as housing for young students, and later on, for cloistered nuns. In the 1970s, the building was purchased by the state of Michigan and used as a state police post, with nearby buildings serving as a prison. The state completed purchasing the site for state park purposes in 1978.

Activities and amenities

References

External links

Saugatuck Dunes State Park Michigan Department of Natural Resources
Saugatuck Dunes State Park Map Michigan Department of Natural Resources

State parks of Michigan
Protected areas of Allegan County, Michigan
Protected areas established in 1977
1977 establishments in Michigan
Beaches of Michigan
Dunes of Michigan
Landforms of Allegan County, Michigan
IUCN Category III